Zhao Lifeng (born 27 April 1978) is a Chinese former swimmer who competed in the 1996 Summer Olympics.

References

1978 births
Living people
Chinese male freestyle swimmers
Olympic swimmers of China
Swimmers at the 1996 Summer Olympics
Asian Games medalists in swimming
Asian Games silver medalists for China
Asian Games bronze medalists for China
Swimmers at the 1998 Asian Games
Medalists at the 1998 Asian Games
20th-century Chinese people